Christianity is the largest religion in Mizoram. The majority 87% of Mizoram population are Christian in various denominations, predominantly Presbyterian. More than 98% of the Mizos are Christians by faith. The Government of Mizoram declared that Christianity plays a very important role among the daily life of Mizo community and therefore further declared that Christianity as the religion of the state. The culture of Mizoram is mainly influenced by Christianity. Hence, Christianity was given a special status on the state by the government while maintaining a minimum level of secular environment & approach. In June 2018, the government of Mizoram including Vanlalruata, president of anti-corruption organisation-turned-political party, People's Representation for Identity and Status of Mizoram claim that Mizoram is a Christian state. Hindus form a small minority (3.55%) mainly of Manipuris and there are also around (7.93%) Buddhists according to the 2001 census, mostly made up from Chakma settlers of Arakan origin. There are about 8,000 mostly ethnic Mizo followers of a Judaic group Bnei Menashe, who claim descent from the biblical Menasseh. Muslims make up about 1.1% of the state population.

The major Christian denomination is the Presbyterian Church. The church Mizoram Presbyterian Church was established by a Welsh Missionary named Rev. D.E. Jones and is one of the constituted body|constituted bodies of the General Assembly of the Presbyterian Church of India, which has its headquarters at Shillong in Meghalaya (India). The administration of the Presbyterian Church is highly centralised. The synod, with its headquarters at Aizawl, is the highest decision-making body of the church with considerable influence. The financial operation, personnel (including selection of missionaries), administration, management and operation of the church are directly or indirectly controlled by the Synod Headquarters. Other Christian churches include the Baptist Church of Mizoram, United Pentecostal Church, the Salvation Army, the Seventh-day Adventist Church, Kohhran Thianghlim, Roman Catholic, Lairam Jesus Christ Baptist Church, and the Evangelical Church of Maraland, Independent Church of India and Evangelical Free Church of India.

Statistics

Trends
Percentage of Christians in Mizoram by decades

Tribes
Percentage of Christians in the Scheduled Tribes

See also
 List of Christian denominations in North East India
History of Christianity in Mizoram

References